Maximiano "Maxie" Vaz (1923 – 21 July 1991) was an Indian field hockey player who competed in the 1948 Summer Olympics.

References

External links
 
 Biography of Maxie Vaz

1923 births
1991 deaths
Field hockey players from Goa
Indian Roman Catholics
Kenyan people of Indian descent
Kenyan people of Goan descent
Olympic field hockey players of India
Field hockey players at the 1948 Summer Olympics
Indian male field hockey players
Olympic gold medalists for India
Olympic medalists in field hockey
Medalists at the 1948 Summer Olympics